Robert S. Williams (born 1949) is an American bassoonist.

Education 
Robert Williams began playing bassoon in junior high school and graduated from Catalina High School in Tucson, Arizona in 1967. He received a Bachelor of Music with honors from the University of Arizona and did further study at the University of Southern California. His bassoon teachers include Wendal Jones in Arizona, Leonard Sharrow at Aspen Music School and Norman Herzberg at Music Academy of the West and University of Southern California.

Career 
While in his sophomore year at the University of Arizona, Robert Williams won the principal bassoon position of the Tucson Symphony Orchestra. From 1972 to 1974, he held solo bassoon positions with the Winnipeg Symphony, Winnipeg CBC Orchestra, Colorado Philharmonic and Tucson Symphony. In 1974, at the age of 24, he won the principal bassoon position of the Detroit Symphony Orchestra. He has also played summer engagements with the Minnesota Orchestra and Boston Symphony at Tanglewood.

Williams also plays in the DSO Bassoon Quartet, the DSO Woodwind Quintet, and the Bellingham Music Festival.

He is on the faculty of Wayne State University and formerly has been on the music faculties of the Aspen Music School and Festival, University of Michigan, Michigan State University, the Grand Teton Orchestra Training Institute, Claremont Music Festival and the Utah Music Festival. He has also given master classes at Tanglewood, the University of Michigan, Michigan State University and the University of Arizona.

Williams can be heard on all of the Detroit Symphony recordings conducted by former Music Director Antal Doráti on the London/Decca label, as well as the recordings on the Chandos label led by Neeme Järvi.

Together with his wife Treva Womble, former English hornist of the Detroit Symphony, he is the owner of Womble/Williams Double Reeds, a home business that specializes in products for the oboe and bassoon.  They are authorized Fox dealers, produce bassoon cane and sell supplies for both oboe and bassoon.

Instrument 
Williams plays on a Fox model 601 bassoon, serial number 55,555 built in South Whitley, Indiana in 2012.

References 

American classical bassoonists
Aspen Music Festival and School faculty
1949 births
Living people
Wayne State University faculty
University of Michigan faculty
Michigan State University faculty
University of Arizona alumni
University of Southern California alumni